Wallace Tillinghast was a Worcester, Massachusetts businessman, and the originator of an airplane hoax in the early 1900s.

History
Tillinghast announced the creation of the first, "heavier-than-air" flying craft in 1909. He explained that he had done more than one hundred flights with this machine under the cover of darkness. Tillinghast stated that he began flying under cover of darkness two months prior to his announcement, his first flight being between Worcester, Massachusetts, and New York City, New York, a distance of approximately 300 miles, where Tillinghast and his crew claimed to have circled the Statue of Liberty at 4,000 feet. At one point, the engines were said to have shut off, and the contraption glided through the air for forty-eight minutes while the mechanics made repairs. After which, they made their way back to Worcester, by way of a route taking them through Boston.

Sightings

Between December 12, 1909, and February 1910, New England newspapers were filled with "sightings" of the aircraft purportedly designed by Tillinghast and two unnamed mechanics.  A sighting over Worcester, Massachusetts on the night of December 22 was reported nationwide.  The sighting followed claims by inventor Wallace Tillinghast that he had invented an airplane that could fly 120 miles per hour.

The author H. P. Lovecraft witnessed a mass sighting of Tillinghast in Providence, Rhode Island on December 24, 1909. While the crowds of people on the street believed they were viewing Tillinghast's airship, Lovecraft identified the object as the planet Venus.

Tillinghast never offered his craft for public viewing or inspection, and the media grew more skeptical, explaining the sightings were most likely Venus or fire balloons.

References

Sources
Whalen, Stephen and Robert E. Bartholomew. "The Great New England Airship Hoax of 1909". The New England Quarterly, Vol. 75, No. 3 (September, 2002), pp. 466–476. 

Hoaxes in the United States
Businesspeople from Worcester, Massachusetts
1900s hoaxes
Year of death missing
Year of birth missing
UFO hoaxes